Oleg Mashkin (born 30 May 1979) is a Ukrainian boxer. He competed in the men's middleweight event at the 2004 Summer Olympics.

References

External links
 

1979 births
Living people
Ukrainian male boxers
Olympic boxers of Ukraine
Boxers at the 2004 Summer Olympics
Sportspeople from Mykolaiv
AIBA World Boxing Championships medalists
Middleweight boxers
21st-century Ukrainian people